The winter skate (Leucoraja ocellata) is a globally-endangered species of skate found in the surrounding waters of northeastern North America. They inhabit shallow shelf waters and are prone to bycatch during commercial fishing.

Description 
The winter skate can reach a maximum size of 109 cm. It reaches maturity around 12 years of age, depending on the sex and area.

Distribution and habitat 
This skate can be found in the northwest Atlantic Ocean, ranging from North of the Gulf of St. Lawrence to South of Newfoundland and Labrador. Winter skates prefer sand and gravel habitats. They are primarily found in depths below 111 m and up to 371 m and in temperatures ranging between -1.2 and -15 C.

The local populations of the winter skate are not all evenly distributed. They are facing extirpation in the Southern Gulf of St. Lawrence, for example, resulting in a lot fewer egg cases found on local beaches. Their range has declined 99% from the 1980s to 2015 in that sector

References

Leucoraja
Endangered fauna of North America
Taxa named by Samuel L. Mitchill
Fauna of the Northeastern United States
Fish of the Atlantic Ocean
Fauna of Atlantic Canada